The 1956–57 Copa México was the 41st edition of the Copa México and the 14th staging in the professional era. Thirteen teams from Primera División and three from Segunda División participated.

The competition started on March 3, 1957, and concluded on April 28, 1957, with the Final, held at the Estadio Olímpico de la Ciudad de los Deportes in Mexico City, in which Zacatepec defeated León 1–0.

Round of 16

|}

Quarterfinals

|}

Semifinals

|}

Final

References

Copa MX
1956–57 in Mexican football
1957 domestic association football cups